South Fork Tenmile Creek is a  long 5th order tributary to Tenmile Creek in Greene County, Pennsylvania.

Variant names
According to the Geographic Names Information System, it has also been known historically as: 
 Ten Mile Creek
 Tenmile Creek

Course
South Fork Tenmile Creek is formed at the confluence of Claylick Run and Grays Run in Rutan, Pennsylvania, and then flows easterly to join Tenmile Creek at Clarksville.

Watershed
South Fork Tenmile Creek drains  of area, receives about 41.1 in/year of precipitation, has a wetness index of 298.56 and is about 68% forested.

See also
List of rivers of Pennsylvania

References

Rivers of Pennsylvania
Rivers of Greene County, Pennsylvania
Allegheny Plateau